Kook Hae-seong (born 8 December 1989) is a South Korean professional baseball outfielder who is currently playing for the Doosan Bears of the KBO League. His major position is right fielder and left fielder, but he sometimes plays as center fielder or first baseman. Upon graduation from high school, he made himself eligible for the 2008 KBO First-Year Player Draft, but went undrafted. Instead, Kook signed a contract with the Chicago Cubs in 2007. However, after the problem of elbow was found and the contract was broken, he was signed by the Doosan Bears as an undrafted free agent.

References

External links 
 Career statistics and player information from the KBO League
 Kook Hae-seong at Doosan Bears Baseball Club

Living people
KBO League outfielders
Doosan Bears players
1989 births
People from Gunsan
Sportspeople from North Jeolla Province